The 2023 Little League World Series will be a youth baseball tournament that is scheduled to take place from August 16 to August 27 at the Little League headquarters complex in South Williamsport, Pennsylvania. Ten teams from the United States and ten teams from other countries will compete in the 76th edition of the Little League World Series (LLWS).

Teams

Regional qualifying tournaments will be held from February to August 2023.

MLB Little League Classic
On August 21, 2022, it was announced that the sixth MLB Little League Classic would feature the Philadelphia Phillies and the Washington Nationals on August 20.

References

2023
2023 Little League World Series
2023 in sports in Pennsylvania
August 2023 sports events in the United States
2023 in baseball